301 is a year, the year 301 CE.

301 may also refer to:

 301 (number)
 301 BC, a year
 301, the name of a game of darts
 North American Area Code 301
 Peugeot 301, a car by Peugeot
 HTTP 301, a status code for Moved Permanently.
 301, a posthumous album by jazz trio e.s.t.
 301 Mission Street, the address of the Millennium tower in San Francisco